Spatial Economic Analysis is a quarterly peer-reviewed academic journal covering the development of theory and methods in spatial economics. It is published by Routledge on behalf of the Regional Studies Association and the British and Irish Section of the Regional Science Association International. The editor-in-chief is Professor Paul Elhorst of the Faculty of Spatial Sciences at the University of Groningen. He succeeded the founding editor-in-chief, Prof Bernard Fingleton of the University of Cambridge in September 2016.

References

External links 
 

Taylor & Francis academic journals
English-language journals
Publications established in 2006
Quarterly journals
Economics journals
Regional science
Economic geography